The Journal of Welsh Religious History is published by the University of Wales Press on behalf of the Centre for the Advanced Study of Religion in Wales (Bangor University) and previously the Welsh Religious History Society. It is an English-language academic journal containing articles, reviews, and news relating to the history of Christianity in Wales. It was originally established in 1984 under the title Journal of Welsh Ecclesiastical History. Since it obtained its current title in 1992, two series were published: First series, Vols. 1 (1993) to 8 (2000); new series Vol. 1 (2001) to Vol. 5 (2005).

In 2015, the University of Wales Press announced a successor journal: the Journal of Religious History, Literature and Culture.

The journal has been digitized by the Welsh Journals Online project at the National Library of Wales.

References

External links
Journal of Welsh Religious History at Welsh Journals Online
Journal of Welsh Ecclesiastical History at Welsh Journals Online

Magazines published in Wales
Christianity studies journals
Annual journals
University of Wales
English-language journals
Publications established in 1984
1984 establishments in Wales
Academic journals published by university presses of the United Kingdom
Historiography of Christianity